Jovan Markoski (born 23 June 1980) is a Serbian former footballer who played as a midfielder. He was capped four times for Serbia and Montenegro.

Club career
Markoski made a name for himself while playing for Železnik, winning the Serbia and Montenegro Cup in 2005. He subsequently spent one year at Zeta, before moving abroad to Ukrainian side Vorskla Poltava in the summer of 2006. He remained at the club for the next nine seasons, making over 200 appearances in the Ukrainian Premier League.

In June 2015, Markoski returned to his homeland, signing a one-year contract with Napredak Kruševac. He helped them win the Serbian First League in the 2015–16 season, thus earning promotion to the Serbian SuperLiga. After featuring in the team's first two matches of the 2018–19 season, Markoski terminated his contract with the club by mutual consent.

In August 2018, Markoski signed with his former club Mladost Lučani, rejoining them after 16 years. He moved back to Napredak Kruševac for the 2019–20 season. In October 2020, Markoski returned to his parent club Radnički Obrenovac.

International career
Markoski made his full international debut for Serbia and Montenegro in a 1–0 friendly loss away against Germany on 30 April 2003. He was also a member of the team at the Kirin Cup in July 2004.

Career statistics

Club

International

Honours
Železnik
 Serbia and Montenegro Cup: 2004–05
Napredak Kruševac
 Serbian First League: 2015–16

Notes

References

External links

 
 

Association football midfielders
Expatriate footballers in Ukraine
FC Vorskla Poltava players
First League of Serbia and Montenegro players
FK Mladost Lučani players
FK Napredak Kruševac players
FK Radnički Obrenovac players
FK Železnik players
FK Zeta players
Footballers from Belgrade
Red Star Belgrade footballers
Serbia and Montenegro footballers
Serbia and Montenegro international footballers
Serbia and Montenegro under-21 international footballers
Serbian expatriate footballers
Serbian expatriate sportspeople in Ukraine
Serbian First League players
Serbian footballers
Serbian SuperLiga players
Ukrainian Premier League players
1980 births
Living people